The Master of Badia a Isola was an Italian painter.  His name is taken from a depiction of the Madonna and Child that hangs in the Badia dei Santi Salvatore e Cirino in Abbadia a Isola, located near Monteriggioni, a comune in the province of Siena; a number of other paintings by his hand are also believed to exist.

References
 Giovanna Nepi Scire, Painting in Venice Museums, Place des Victoires Editions, 2008, p. 87

13th-century Italian painters
14th-century Italian painters
Badia a Isola, Master of